

List of Mayors

The following is a list of mayors of the American city of Topeka, Kansas.

See also

 List of people from Topeka, Kansas
 Timeline of Topeka, Kansas

References

Sources
 City of Topeka website

Topeka